Trapania cirrita is a species of sea slug, a dorid nudibranch, a marine gastropod mollusc in the family Goniodorididae.

Distribution
This species was first described from South Africa.

Description
This goniodorid nudibranch is translucent brown in colour, with an irregular network of short white lines on the body.

Ecology
Trapania cirrita probably feeds on Entoprocta which often grow on sponges and other living substrata.

References

Goniodorididae
Gastropods described in 2008